Yawn is the fourth studio album by English singer-songwriter Bill Ryder-Jones. It was released on 2 November 2018, by Domino Recording Company.

Release
On 21 August 2018, Ryder-Jones announced the release of his fourth studio album, along with the single "Mither". The music video to the single was directed by James Slater, and shows Ryder-Jones performing in a factory. In a press release, Bill said of the album: "Yawn is an album that looks for understanding - down the back of life's sofa. These are everyday stories about situations we all fall from and into, out of, and back up against the wall again - and they are sung to us, up close, by a voice still in hock to a few uncomfortable truths."

The second single "And Then There's You" was released on 5 September 2018.

A reworked version of the album titled Yawny Yawn, featuring only vocals and piano, was released in 2019.

Critical reception
Yawn was met with "universal acclaim" reviews from critics. At Metacritic, which assigns a weighted average rating out of 100 to reviews from mainstream publications, this release received an average score of 81 based on 12 reviews. Aggregator Album of the Year gave the release a 80 out of 100 based on a critical consensus of 13 reviews.

Timothy Monger of AllMusic explained the release "takes the form of gently melodic and sometimes noisy slowcore guitar rock, its slow dreamy grooves punctuated with squalls of distortion and grainy textures.  Yawn has its moments of beauty and craft, but the payoffs are so subtle and slow to arrive that its title becomes the regrettably inevitable reaction." Sarah Pope of DIY gave the release three stars out of five, explaining that the albums "10 tracks all sprawl along at a similar down-tempo pace, Bill’s fragile whisper of a croon only adding to the aura of lethargic night times spent alone."

Track listing

Personnel

Musicians
 Bill Ryder-Jones – primary artist, producer
 Rod Skipp – cello
 Phil Murphy – drums
 Naomi Mann – backing vocals
 Esme Hand-Halford – backing vocals
 Sidonie Hand-Halford – backing vocals

Production
 Rich Hurst – engineer
 Liam Power – engineer
 Alex Quinn – engineer
 Charlotte Sutcliffe – engineer
 Jay Leahey – engineer
 Craig Silvey – mixing
 Guy Davie – mastering
 Paul Briggs – design

Charts

References

2018 albums
Bill Ryder-Jones albums
Domino Recording Company albums